The Adelaide Street Circuit (also known as the Adelaide Parklands Circuit) is a temporary street circuit in the East Parklands adjacent to the Adelaide central business district in South Australia, Australia.

The  "Grand Prix" version of the track hosted eleven Formula One Australian Grand Prix events from 1985 to 1995, as well as an American Le Mans Series endurance race on New Year's Eve in 2000 (Race of a Thousand Years). Between 1999 and 2020 and again from 2022, a shortened  version of the circuit has been used for the Adelaide 500 touring car race. A sprint version of the circuit was used after 2014.

Formula 1 Grand Prix

1985: McLaren's three time and defending World Champion Niki Lauda raced his last Grand Prix before retiring, crashing out of the lead on lap 57 with brake failure. Brazilian Ayrton Senna took pole position with a time of 1:19.843 in his Lotus-Renault. Senna retired from the lead with a blown engine on lap 62. Earlier in the race he had hit Rosberg's Williams-Honda at the pits hairpin as the Finn braked to pit for tyres, with Senna losing the front wing of his car. He did a full lap before missing the pits after driving too quickly through the previous turn, causing him to do a second lap with the missing front wing. Finishing 2nd and 3rd were Ligier pair Jacques Laffite and Philippe Streiff. Streiff tried to overtake his teammate with just over a lap to go and collided with him. Both carried on; Laffite was undamaged but Streiff's left front wheel was held on only by the suspension mounting points which had not broken all the way through. Only 8 of the 26 starters reached the chequered flag in a race run in 35 °C heat. It was the last Grand Prix for the factory Renault team, the pioneers of turbocharging in F1 bowing out as a constructor (Renault would return to Grand Prix Racing as a constructor in ).
He managed to drive the car to safety and avoid a heavy impact with the wall (Mansell later noted that had he not been able to control the car and had hit the wall, the accident most likely would have seen the race stopped, which would have left him as the World Champion). One lap earlier, Keke Rosberg, in his final race before retiring, had also suffered a tyre failure. Rosberg, who at the time led by over 30 seconds, thought it was an engine problem, pulled off the circuit and got out of the McLaren-TAG, not knowing he could have easily made it to the pits to change tyres (the Finn was seen looking at the back of his car soon after stopping before throwing his arms up in despair after a marshal pointed out the tyre). Prost's win saw him become the first, and as of 2018, the only winner of the Australian Grand Prix in both World Championship and Australian domestic formats, having previously won the race in 1982. It was the last race for Australia's  World Champion Alan Jones, who retired from F1 for good after qualifying his Lola-Ford 15th, and retiring from the race with a blown engine on lap 15. It was also the team's last race and the last race for his teammate Patrick Tambay. It was also the last race in which the Lotus team would carry the black and gold sponsorship colours of John Player Special, or run the Renault turbo engine, the turbo pioneers in F1 not supplying their turbocharged engines after the season.
1987: Both qualifying and the race were dominated by Ferrari's Gerhard Berger, who won from pole and set the fastest lap, after also having won the previous race in Japan from pole. Ayrton Senna finished 2nd on the road in his Lotus-Honda, but was later disqualified for oversized brake ducts, giving Berger's teammate Michele Alboreto 2nd place and Ferrari's first 1–2 since the 1985 Canadian Grand Prix. Thierry Boutsen finished 3rd in his Benetton-Ford in the last race for the Ford V6 turbo as the company had decided to build an all new V8 engine in readiness for the new naturally aspirated formula to be introduced in 1989.
1988: In a season almost totally dominated by the McLaren-Hondas of  World Champion Ayrton Senna and his teammate Alain Prost, Senna took his 13th pole of the season, the pair over 1.6 seconds faster than Nigel Mansell in his atmospheric Williams-Judd. Ferrari's Gerhard Berger, knowing that he most likely would not finish before running out of fuel, told race favourites Prost and Senna that he was going to send the Ferrari turbo out in a blaze of glory by running full turbo boost and would pass them early to put on a show for the fans. Berger's teammate Michele Alboreto, in his last race for the team, had planned to do the same but a clash with the Dallara-Ford of fellow Italian driver Alex Caffi just 3 corners into the race saw him retire with suspension damage. Throwing caution to the wind, Berger made good on his promise and charged, first passing Senna on lap 3 then taking the lead from Prost on lap 14. He continued to build a lead until taken out by Ligier's René Arnoux on lap 25 while lapping the Frenchman. Prost then won from Senna, with outgoing World Champion Nelson Piquet in his Lotus-Honda making it an all Honda turbo podium in the last F1 race for turbo powered cars.
1989: The first of two wet races in Adelaide. Newly crowned World Champion Alain Prost (McLaren) pulled out after only one lap protesting the conditions. Only eight cars finished, with retirements including former World Champions Nelson Piquet who drove his Lotus into the back of Piercarlo Ghinzani's Osella on lap 19, and Ayrton Senna who drove his McLaren-Honda into the back of Martin Brundle's Brabham-Judd while some 30 seconds in the lead on lap 13. Television commentator Murray Walker described the vision from the rearward-facing camera on Brundle's car as "Senna bearing down on it like Jaws". Thierry Boutsen, who had finished 3rd in 1987, won his second Grand Prix of the season for Williams-Renault (and his second wet race) from the Benetton of the Japanese Grand Prix winner Alessandro Nannini. Satoru Nakajima spun at the chicane on the first lap, but then charged hard through the field, setting the fastest lap of the race (1:38.480 compared to Senna's pole time of 1:16.665) and was rewarded with 4th place, only 4.648 seconds behind the Williams of Riccardo Patrese.
1990: The 500th World Championship Grand Prix held was again held in oppressive heat. Newly crowned World Champion Ayrton Senna again dominated qualifying and won the pole in his McLaren-Honda. He then led the race for 61 laps before crashing out when his gearbox failed. Nelson Piquet (Benetton-Ford) won his second F1 GP in a row having won the previous race in Japan. Ferrari's Nigel Mansell set numerous lap records chasing Senna and later Piquet, only to finish 2nd by 3 seconds after a passing move on the last lap at the hairpin at the end of the Brabham Straight just missed taking both cars out. Mansell pulled out to lap the Brabham of Stefano Modena and attempted to take the Benetton as well, but was too far back and only just managed to slow his Ferrari up enough to avoid Piquet as he turned into the corner.

1991: Due to the wet conditions, the race was stopped after 14 laps. Only half points were awarded for the race, the first time it had happened in F1 since the wet 1984 Monaco Grand Prix. This race held the record for the shortest Grand Prix until that record was broken by the 2021 Belgian Grand Prix.
1992: In his last F1 race before moving to the US-based Indy Car championship,  World Champion Nigel Mansell qualified his Williams-Renault on pole position. He was taken out at the pits hairpin while leading on lap 18 by the McLaren-Honda of outgoing World Champion Ayrton Senna. Senna's teammate Gerhard Berger narrowly won his second Australian Grand Prix, finishing only 0.741 in front of Michael Schumacher's Benetton-Ford. Martin Brundle finished 3rd in his Benetton, 54 seconds behind Berger and Schumacher. After five years (1988–92), four World Drivers' Championships, four Constructors Championships (1988–91) and 44 wins (15 turbo and 29 non-turbo), it was the last F1 race for McLaren using Honda engines with the Japanese company pulling out of Formula One.

1993: Ayrton Senna's 41st and last Grand Prix win in his last race for McLaren, and the 62nd pole position of his career. It was also the last of 199 Grands Prix for four time (and ) World Champion Alain Prost who finished 2nd in his Williams-Renault. Prost's teammate Damon Hill, the son of twice ( and ) World Champion Graham Hill (who also won the non-championship 1966 AGP), finished 3rd.
1994: In  the World Championship was decided in Adelaide for the second time. Damon Hill (Williams-Renault) and Michael Schumacher (Benetton-Ford) collided on lap 35 at turn 6, and neither was able to complete the race. Schumacher therefore won the drivers' championship, with Hill finishing in second place, one point behind. Making what was thought to be a one off comeback, 1992 World Champion Nigel Mansell, driving for Williams, claimed the pole position for the race which also won Williams their 3rd straight Constructors' Championship and their 7th overall (Mansell had driven for the team in four of their Constructors' title winning years). He went on to score his 31st and last F1 win from the Ferrari of his former Ferrari teammate of 1989 Gerhard Berger, and Martin Brundle in the McLaren-Peugeot.
1995: McLaren-Mercedes driver Mika Häkkinen suffered a tyre failure during the first qualifying session on Friday at the high speed Brewery Bend between Jones and Brabham Straights. He crashed heavily into the wall and required an emergency tracheotomy, which was performed by the side of the track by an off-duty local doctor who happened to be spectating where Häkkinen crashed. The Finnish driver was then transported to the Royal Adelaide Hospital, less than 1 km from the point of the circuit where he crashed. He would spend a month recovering in the hospital. Damon Hill won the final Grand Prix held at the circuit, lapping all the finishers by at least two laps. Hill's win saw he and his late father Graham (1966) join Stan (1959) and Alan Jones (1980) as the only father-son combinations to win the Australian Grand Prix (they would later be joined by Keke and Nico Rosberg who won in 1985 and 2014 respectively). The final Grand Prix in Adelaide set a Formula One attendance record of 210,000, which stood until 250,000 attended the 2000 United States Grand Prix held at the Indianapolis Motor Speedway. The race was also the third time the Australian Grand Prix in Adelaide had won the Formula One Race Promoters' Trophy as the best run Formula One Grand Prix of the season, having also won in 1985 and 1990.

Supercars

During Adelaide's era hosting the Australian Grand Prix, the circuit hosted annual non-championship races for the Australian Touring Car Championship.

From 1999 until 2020, the track hosted an annual Supercars race, the Adelaide 500, (in most years a 2 x 250 km race) on a shorter,  variant of the track. The event became one of the most acclaimed on the Supercars calendar, and is the only event added to the Supercars Hall of Fame. The event returned in 2022.

Circuit

Pit Straight 

All the buildings and grandstands are temporary and were removed each year due to ongoing campaigning by the Adelaide Parklands Preservation Association Inc.

Senna Chicane (Turns 1, 2 and 3)

At the end of the straight, drivers negotiate the Senna Chicane, so named after triple World Champion Ayrton Senna following his death at the 1994 San Marino Grand Prix. Senna had sat on the pole for the first Adelaide Grand Prix in 1985, and would go on to take the pole in Adelaide 6 times in 9 races, while winning in 1991 (the second shortest race in Formula One history due to torrential rain, after the 2021 Belgian Grand Prix), as well as his last career victory in 1993.

Wakefield Road climb
After the chicane the cars take a fast left turn to go uphill on a short straight on Wakefield Road to East Terrace.

Christian Brothers College (Turn 4) 
The first of a series of three 90 degree corners. The first corner was notable for the fortunate vantage point of Christian Brothers College.

Market Chicane (Turns 7 and 8)
Followed by fourth onto Bartels Road back across the parklands. Then the track follows the fast turn 8 sweeper. This corner was re-configured in 2009 and it produced some protests from many of the teams due to its speed and lack of runoff area. Turn 8 has been the site of many crashes in the various categories that have used the shortened version of the circuit.

Stag Corner (Turn 9) 

The full Grand Prix circuit bypasses the turn onto Bartels Road and continues with a sweeping left-right-right into Stag Turn (turn 9).

Brewery Bend (Turn 10) 
Brewery Bend is a fast right-hand sweeper named after the Kent Town Brewery that opens onto Dequetteville Terrace.

Dequetteville Terrace 
The Dequetteville Terrace straight (named after Brabham for Formula 1 and Peter Brock for the Adelaide 500) was a  stretch where the over  Formula One cars in the turbo era (1985–88) were reaching speeds in excess of  making Adelaide easily the fastest street circuit of the time as the only others were the much tighter Monaco, Detroit and Phoenix circuits. In 2007 this section of track was renamed Brock Straight after touring car driver Peter Brock.

Britannia Roundabout / Fosters Corner (Turn 11) 

At the end of Brabham Straight is a right hand hairpin turn (at the Britannia Roundabout) that directs the driver back onto Wakefield Road.

Victoria Park (Turns 12, 13, 14 and 15)
After accelerating out of the hairpin the driver faces a left turn and a long sweeping right-hand curve back into Victoria Park behind the pit area. The lap concludes with another right-hand hairpin (Racetrack Hairpin) onto the pit straight.

The track is essentially flat except for a small valley on the Brock Straight, and a slight incline on Jones Straight, while the run-up Wakefield Road from turns 3 to 4 also has a slight incline. All of these sections of the track run in an east–west direction.

During the Formula One and early V8 Supercar eras the Victoria Park Racecourse, a horse racing track, was located at the park, though has since been removed.

Sprint Circuit
Between 2014 and 2018, an annual Adelaide Motorsport Festival ran on the Victoria Park Sprint Circuit, a shortened  layout. The layout turned right along Wakefield Street after the Senna Chicane and then rejoined the main circuit for the final corners. The event had attracted older Formula 1 machinery, with Ivan Capelli holding the lap record in a March CG891. The event is scheduled to return on March 24-26, 2023.

Lap records

The fastest ever recorded lap of the original  Grand Prix Circuit was 1:13.371 by triple World Champion Ayrton Senna driving a McLaren MP4/8 Ford during qualifying for the 1993 Australian Grand Prix. However, as this was in qualifying and not a race, it does not count as the lap record.

The fastest officially recorded lap of the  Supercars circuit is 1:16.8155 set by Joey Mawson on 2 December 2022 driving a Ligier JS F3-S5000 in 2022 S5000 Tasman Series. As of December 2022, the official race lap records at Adelaide Street Circuit are listed as:

Sprint circuit
The fastest recorded lap of the  Victoria Park Sprint circuit is 0:42.5753 set by Ivan Capelli on 2 December 2018 driving a March CG891 car from the 1989 Formula One season.

Other information 

When the idea of holding a Grand Prix in the parklands was first raised, there was some opposition from people concerned about environmental damage, as the parks have a number of mature trees with birds and possums living in them. There is no larger wildlife in the parklands, as they are heavily developed. These concerns seem to have been proven unfounded, as spectators often watch magpies and rosellas when there is nothing happening on the track. Indeed, the total road traffic during race weekend is significantly less than there is any other day of the year.

The race meetings have the feature race, but also a number of races for "lesser" categories, making four days of entertainment for the crowds of spectators, without long periods of boredom that could occur if only practice and qualifying for the main event preceded it. Many of the events also have after-race concerts on a stage erected for the purpose on a playing field in the middle of the track. Some of the artists who have performed the concerts either at the Grand Prix or the Clipsal 500 include Cher, Paul Simon, Tina Turner, Daryl Braithwaite, INXS and Kiss. During her concert following the 1993 AGP, Tina Turner had an impromptu visitor in the form of the race winner and triple World Champion Ayrton Senna. Although she had already performed the song earlier, as a tribute to Senna, Turner again sung her hit song "The Best".

The stadium section also hosted the Pedal Prix and a prologue stage of the Classic Adelaide Rally and the replacement Targa Adelaide Rally.

The pit straight is used each November for the Sporting Car Club of South Australia's annual John Blanden's Climb to the Eagle. This event commenced as part of the 1985 Formula One with many well known racing identities taking part. The event sees up to 600 sports and exotic cars lined up on the starting grid before leaving to drive to Eagle on the Hill in the Adelaide Hills on the Friday of the weekend when the F1 Grand Prix was traditionally held in Adelaide. Another event held in November is the annual Toy Run which features over 1,000 motorcycle riders donating toys for under privileged children. The Toy Run moved to using the pit straight as its starting point in 2012 after previously starting from Glenelg.

Gallery

See also
Supercars Championship
Formula One
American Le Mans Series
Australian Grand Prix
Melbourne Grand Prix Circuit

Notes

References

External links
Clipsal 500

Grandprix.com GP Encyclopedia: Circuits: Adelaide
Satellite picture by Google Maps

Motorsport venues in South Australia
Formula One circuits
Australian Grand Prix
Streets in Adelaide
Supercars Championship circuits
American Le Mans Series circuits
Sports venues in Adelaide
Motorsport in Adelaide